William David Parker (27 May 1915 – October 1980) was an English professional footballer who played in the Football League for Hull City and Wolverhampton Wanderers as a full back.

Career statistics

References

English footballers
English Football League players

1915 births
1980 deaths
Footballers from Liverpool
Association football fullbacks
Marine F.C. players
Hull City A.F.C. players
Wolverhampton Wanderers F.C. players
South Liverpool F.C. players
Formby F.C. players